Savignia is a genus of sheet weavers that was first described by John Blackwall in 1833. The name honors the French naturalist Marie Jules César Savigny.

Species
 it contains twenty-three species, found in Europe, Africa, Asia, Oceania, the United States, on Comoros, in Western Australia, and Alaska:
Savignia amurensis Eskov, 1991 – Russia
Savignia badzhalensis Eskov, 1991 – Russia
Savignia basarukini Eskov, 1988 – Russia
Savignia birostra (Chamberlin & Ivie, 1947) – Russia, China, USA (Alaska)
Savignia borea Eskov, 1988 – Russia
Savignia bureensis Tanasevitch & Trilikauskas, 2006 – Russia
Savignia centrasiatica Eskov, 1991 – Russia
Savignia erythrocephala (Simon, 1908) – Australia (Western Australia)
Savignia eskovi Marusik, Koponen & Danilov, 2001 – Russia
Savignia frontata Blackwall, 1833 (type) – Europe, Caucasus, Russia to Kazakhstan
Savignia fronticornis (Simon, 1884) – Mediterranean
Savignia harmsi Wunderlich, 1980 – Spain
Savignia kartalensis Jocqué, 1985 – Comoros
Savignia kawachiensis Oi, 1960 – Korea, Japan
Savignia naniplopi Bosselaers & Henderickx, 2002 – Greece (Crete)
Savignia producta Holm, 1977 – Scandinavia, Russia
Savignia pseudofrontata Paik, 1978 – Korea
Savignia rostellatra Song & Li, 2009 – China
Savignia saitoi Eskov, 1988 – Russia
Savignia superstes Thaler, 1984 – France
Savignia ussurica Eskov, 1988 – Russia
Savignia yasudai (Saito, 1986) – Japan
Savignia zero Eskov, 1988 – Russia

See also
 List of Linyphiidae species (Q–Z)

References

Araneomorphae genera
Linyphiidae
Palearctic spiders
Spiders of Asia
Spiders of Australia
Taxa named by John Blackwall